Yelwa Hawks Bauchi is a Nigerian professional basketball club. The club competes in the Nigerian Premier League.

References

External links
Africa-Basket.com Team Page

Basketball teams in Nigeria